The German Kart Championship is a kart racing series based in Germany, event ruled and organized by the Deutscher Motor Sport Bund. 

The series is held annually on the most modern and largest outdoor karting tracks in Germany. The German Kart Championship is divided into four classifications: German Kart Championship (DKM), German Challenger Kart Championship (DCKM), German Junior Kart Championship (DJKM) and German Switching Kart Championship (DSKM).

Champions

References

External links
 Official website
 Organization website

Kart racing series
Karting Championship
Auto racing series in West Germany